John Fitzgerald and Anders Järryd defeated Ken Flach and Robert Seguso in the final, 6–4, 6–4, 2–6, 6–4 to win the doubles tennis title at the 1991 ATP Tour World Championships.

Guy Forget and Jakob Hlasek were the reigning champions, but did not compete this year.

Draw

Finals

Group A
Standings are determined by: 1. number of wins; 2. number of matches; 3. in two-players-ties, head-to-head records; 4. in three-players-ties, percentage of sets won, or of games won; 5. steering-committee decision.

Group B
Standings are determined by: 1. number of wins; 2. number of matches; 3. in two-players-ties, head-to-head records; 4. in three-players-ties, percentage of sets won, or of games won; 5. steering-committee decision.

External links
ATP Tour World Championships Doubles Draw

Doubles
Tennis tournaments in South Africa
1991 in South African tennis
Sports competitions in Johannesburg